Ctenodus (from  , 'comb' and   'tooth') is an extinct genus of prehistoric lungfish and the longest-surviving genus of Carboniferous lungfish.

References 

Prehistoric lungfish genera
Carboniferous bony fish
Taxa named by Louis Agassiz